Arf-GAP with coiled-coil, ANK repeat and PH domain-containing protein 2 is a protein that in humans is encoded by the ACAP2 gene.

References

Further reading

External links